Meg Frances Kendal (born 25 December 1989) is a New Zealand-born Irish former cricketer who played as a wicket-keeper and right-handed batter. She appeared in 6 One Day Internationals for Ireland in 2016 and 2017. She played domestic cricket for Canterbury and Typhoons.

References

External links

1989 births
Living people
Cricketers from Christchurch
Irish women cricketers
Ireland women One Day International cricketers
Canterbury Magicians cricketers
Typhoons (women's cricket) cricketers
Wicket-keepers